Henry O'Brien, 5th Earl of Thomond PC (Ire) (1588–1639), styled Lord Ibrickane until 1624, was summoned to the House of Lords of the Irish Parliament of 1613–1615.

Birth and origins 
Henry was born the eldest son of Donogh O'Brien and Elizabeth FitzGerald. His father was the 4th Earl of Thomond. His father's family were the O'Briens, an important Gaelic Irish dynasty, that descended from Brian Boru, medieval high king of Ireland.

Henry's mother was the fourth daughter of Gerald FitzGerald, 11th Earl of Kildare and his wife Mabel Brown.

Marriage and children 
On 13 July 1608 O'Brien married Mary Brereton, a rich heiress, the only daughter of William Brereton, 1st Baron Brereton and Margaret Savage.

 
Henry and Mary had five daughters:
Mary (died 1686) married, on 24 June 1627, Charles Cokayne, 1st Viscount Cullen
Margaret, who married first Edward Somerset, 2nd Marquess of Worcester and secondly Donough Kearney
Elisabeth (1656–1659) married, on 21 August 1636, Dutton Gerard, 3rd Baron Gerard (1613–1640), grandson of Thomas Gerard, 1st Baron Gerard
Anne (died 1645) married, in 1641, Henry O'Brien, 7th Earl of Thomond
Honora married first Sir Francis Inglefield, knight of Wotton-Bassett, and secondly Sir Robert Howard, knight, son of the Earl of Berkshire

House of Lords 
O'Brien was summoned on 3 March 1613 as Lord Ibrickane to the Irish House of Lords of the Irish Parliament of 1613–1615, the only parliament of King James I in Ireland.

5th Earl 
Ibrickane succeeded his father on 5 September 1624 as the 5th Earl of Thomond.

Death 
Thomond died in 1639 and was buried in St Mary's Cathedral, Limerick. He had no son and was succeeded in his titles by his brother Barnabas O'Brien, 6th Earl of Thomond.

Notes and references

Notes

Citations

Sources 

 
  – S to T (for Thomond)
 

1588 births
1639 deaths
16th-century Irish people
17th-century Irish people
Earls of Thomond
Henry
People from County Clare
Irish chiefs of the name